"Vem e som oss" is a song by Swedish singer Anis Don Demina. The song was performed for the first time in Melodifestivalen 2020, where it made it to the final through the Second Chance round. Demina finished in fifth place with the song, scoring 82 points. The song peaked at number 3 on the Swedish single chart.

Charts

Weekly charts

Year-end charts

Certifications

References

2020 singles
Melodifestivalen songs of 2020
Songs written by Wrethov